Woody Outlaw is a world-record-setting charter boat captain out of Ocracoke, North Carolina.  The fish that set this world record exceeded the previous record by almost 20%. 

On November, 4 1987, Outlaw was trolling on his boat, the Sea Walker, when they caught the 13 pound Spanish mackerel on a blue and white Sea Witch with a strip of fastback menhaden on a 7/0 hook, held by a Shimano bait-casting reel on a Kuna rod with 30-pound test line.

References

External links
Mackerel at the World Fishing Network
 North Carolina State Saltwater Records

American fishers
American sailors
Angling records
People from Ocracoke, North Carolina